The Great Unity Party (BBP) or Great Union Party is a far-right Sunni Islamist and ultranationalist political party in Turkey, created on 29 January 1993. It is considered to be close to the Grey Wolves  organization, and is related to the "Alperen Ocakları" tendency, which operated a synthesis between cultural nationalism and Islamism, and separated itself from the Nationalist Task Party (MÇP), which was renamed to Nationalist Movement Party (MHP) in July 1992.

Although it is claimed that the founder of the party Muhsin Yazıcıoğlu left the Nationalist Movement Party (Turkish: Milliyetçi Hareket Partisi, MHP) for lack of religious convictions, this should be seen rather as a speculation as Muhsin Yazıcıoğlu rarely blamed the MHP or talked about the separation. The rift between Muhsin Yazıcıoğlu and Alparslan Türkeş actually started after the 1980 Turkish coup d'état. Alparslan Türkeş defended himself in the infamous speech in which he declared "My opinions and beliefs are of the same as the generals who organized the 1980 Turkish coup d'état, yet I am in prison" speech during trials after the coup. The ideological separation started then and reached the surface after Alparslan Türkeş dismissed the Ankara headquarters of the MHP after the 1992 MHP Congress. The delegates had elected the candidate supported by Muhsin Yazıcıoğlu rather than the candidate of Alparslan Türkeş environment. Türkeş's dismissal, seen to show an anti-democratic approach, was the final blow to the relationship between the young circle who had suffered during the 1980 coup, and the old guard which circled around Alparslan Türkeş.

The party has been represented in the Parliament only via electoral coalitions with popular parties. At the 2002 legislative elections, the party won 1.1% of the popular vote and no seats; in the 2007 elections Muhsin Yazıcıoğlu was elected as an independent. In 2009 local elections the BBP's candidate was elected as the new mayor of Sivas.

2009 helicopter crash and death of Muhsin Yazıcıoğlu

On 25 March 2009, the leader of the BBP, Muhsin Yazıcıoğlu, died in a helicopter crash in south-eastern Turkey. A large search and rescue operation was conducted in the mountainous area around Göksun in Kahramanmaraş Province. The helicopter wreckage was found 47 hours after the crash, and all six people on board were found dead. İsmail Güneş, a reporter of the Ihlas News Agency, who was accompanying Yazıcıoğlu, initially survived the crash and placed a desperate call for help just after the crash, and reported a broken leg. By the time the search party located the crash site in the inclement weather, all six aboard, including Güneş, were dead. Yazıcıoğlu had been traveling from Çağlayancerit in Kahramanmaraş Province to Yerköy in Yozgat Province in central Anatolia for another political rally before local elections on 29 March when the chartered helicopter crashed.

2010 Gaza Freedom Flotilla

A delegation representing the BBP participated in the Gaza Freedom Flotilla on board the ship MV Mavi Marmara in May 2010.

2016 gay pride march in Istanbul
In 2016, the Alperen threatened to stop the annual gay pride march in Istanbul. Alperen's Istanbul chief, Kursat Mican, stated:

Degenerates will not be allowed to carry out their fantasies on this land...We're not responsible for what will happen after this point ... We do not want people to walk around half-naked with alcohol bottles in their hands in this sacred city watered by the blood of our ancestors.

See also
:Category:Great Unity Party politicians

References

External links
 

1993 establishments in Turkey
Islamic political parties in Turkey
Far-right political parties in Turkey
Nationalist parties in Turkey
Turanism
Turkish nationalism
Pan-Turkism
Idealism (Turkey)
Organizations based in Ankara
Political parties established in 1993
Political parties in Turkey
Turkish nationalist organizations
Islamic nationalism
National conservative parties